Novovoznesenovka is a village in the Ak-Suu District of Issyk-Kul Region of Kyrgyzstan. Its population was 3,624 in 2021.

References
 

Populated places in Issyk-Kul Region